The Belden Stratford is an apartment building and former hotel in the Lincoln Park neighborhood of Chicago. It is located across the street from the Lincoln Park Zoo and Lincoln Park Conservatory.

The structure was built in the 1920s and renovated between 1989 and 1990. Notable guests over the years included Louis Armstrong and Gloria Swanson.

In 2011 IRMCO Properties & Management, which owned and managed the Belden Stratford, sold the property to the Laramar Group.  Laramar Group sold the property in late 2018, and Waterton now manages the property on behalf of the owner.

References

External links
Official website

Buildings and structures on the National Register of Historic Places in Chicago
Hotel buildings on the National Register of Historic Places in Illinois
Beaux-Arts architecture in Illinois
Hotel buildings completed in 1923
Apartment buildings in Chicago